Reginald Stanley Machin (16 April 1904 – 3 November 1968) was an English first-class cricketer who played for Surrey and Cambridge University. He was active from 1926–34. He was born in Weybridge; died in Wellingborough.

References

1904 births
1968 deaths
English cricketers
Surrey cricketers
Cambridge University cricketers
Gentlemen cricketers